Singapore participated in the 2010 Asian Games in Guangzhou, China.

Medal table

Medalists 

Nations at the 2010 Asian Games
2010
Asian Games